The Chorus is the original soundtrack of the 2004 Academy Award and Golden Globe-nominated film The Chorus (original title: Les choristes) starring Gérard Jugnot, François Berléand, Kad Merad and Jean-Baptiste Maunier. The original score was composed by Bruno Coulais and performed by Les Petits Chanteurs de Saint-Marc and the Bulgarian Symphony Orchestra.

The album won the César Award for Best Music Written for a Film and was nominated for the BAFTA Award for Best Film Music (but lost to the score of Los Diarios de Motocicleta). The song "Look To Your Path" (original title: "Vois Sur Ton Chemin") was nominated for an Academy Award.

Track listing 
1.  Les Choristes 1:32 
2.  In Memoriam 3:25 
3.  L'arrivée À L'école 1:32 
4.  Pépinot 1:50 
5.  Vois Sur Ton Chemin 2:19 (nominated for the Academy Award for Best Original Song)
6.  Les Partitions 1:03 
7.  Caresse Sur L'océan 2:10 
8.  Lueur D'été 2:02 
9.  Cerf-Volant 0:58 
10.  Sous La Pluie 1:05 
11.  Compère Guilleri 0:35 
12.  La Désillusion 1:22 
13.  La Nuit 2:21 
14.  L'incendie 1:23 
15.  L'évocation 1:45 
16.  Les Avions En Papier 1:28 
17.  Action Réaction 1:45 
18.  Seuls 1:53 
19.  Morhange 1:57 
20.  In Mémoriam A Cappella 3:19 
21.  Nous Sommes De Fond De L'étang 2:46 
Total Album Time: 38:30

Certifications

References

External links
Soundtrack.net profile

2004 soundtrack albums
Drama film soundtracks